Prosotas pia, the margined lineblue, is a species of blue (Lycaenidae) butterfly found in Asia.

Range
The butterfly occurs in India from in the Himalayas from Sikkim to Assam and Naga hills. The range extends eastwards to Myanmar and southern Yunnan. It also occurs in Sundaland, Sulawesi and Serang in South-East Asia.

See also
List of butterflies of India (Lycaenidae)

Cited references

References
 
 
 
 
 

Prosotas
Butterflies of Asia
Taxa named by Lambertus Johannes Toxopeus